Creswell High School was a public high school located in Creswell, North Carolina.  It was one of two high schools, along with Plymouth High School, in Washington County Schools.  Creswell High School served grades 6–12. Creswell High School's enrollment as of 2010 was 161 students.  The student body was 52% Black; 39% White; 5% Hispanic; and 4% Unknown.  All Creswell students received a free or reduced lunch. It was shut down following the class of 2018 as the county made room for Washington County High School. The shutdown of Creswell High lost the county a total of 44 students to neighboring county school systems, a large portion of the small school.

References

Public high schools in North Carolina
Schools in Washington County, North Carolina
Public middle schools in North Carolina